José Leyver Ojeda Blas (born 12 November 1985) is a Mexican race walker. He competed in the 50 kilometres walk event at the 2012 Summer Olympics.

In 2021, he represented Mexico at the 2020 Summer Olympics, where he placed 15th in the men's 50 kilometres walk with a season best.

Personal bests

Track walk
20,000 m: 1:30:15.60 hrs –  Monterrey, 22 June 2008

Road walk
20 km: 1:22:30 hrs –  Rio Maior, 9 April 2011
50 km: 3:49:16 hrs –  Guadalajara, 29 October 2011

Achievements

References

External links

Sports reference biography

Mexican male racewalkers
1985 births
Living people
Olympic athletes of Mexico
Athletes (track and field) at the 2012 Summer Olympics
Athletes (track and field) at the 2016 Summer Olympics
Sportspeople from Veracruz
Pan American Games silver medalists for Mexico
Pan American Games medalists in athletics (track and field)
Central American and Caribbean Games gold medalists for Mexico
Athletes (track and field) at the 2011 Pan American Games
Competitors at the 2018 Central American and Caribbean Games
Central American and Caribbean Games medalists in athletics
Medalists at the 2011 Pan American Games
Athletes (track and field) at the 2020 Summer Olympics
People from Coatzacoalcos
21st-century Mexican people